Western Marxism is a current of Marxist theory that arose from Western and Central Europe in the aftermath of the 1917 October Revolution in Russia and the ascent of Leninism. The term denotes a loose collection of theorists who advanced an interpretation of Marxism distinct from both classical and Orthodox Marxism and the Marxism-Leninism of the Soviet Union. 

Less concerned with economic analysis than earlier schools of Marxist thought, Western Marxism placed greater emphasis on the study of the cultural trends of capitalist society, deploying the more philosophical and subjective aspects of Marxism, and incorporating non-Marxist approaches to investigating culture and historical development. An important theme was the origins of Karl Marx's thought in the philosophy of Georg Wilhelm Friedrich Hegel and the recovery of what they called the "Young Marx" (the more humanistic early works of Marx). Although early figures, such as György Lukács and Antonio Gramsci were prominent politically, Perry Anderson in the mid-1970s characterised Western Marxism after the Second World War as predominantly undertaken by university-based philosophers, exemplified by Theodor Adorno, Galvano Della Volpe and Herbert Marcuse, among others.

Since the 1960s, the concept has been closely associated with the New Left. While many Western Marxists were adherents of Marxist humanism, the term also encompasses figures and schools of thought, such as the structural Marxists Louis Althusser and Nicos Poulantzas, that were strongly critical of Hegelianism and humanism.

Terminology
In the 1920s, the Third International  disparagingly branded certain tendencies within its ranks as "West European" theorists. By 1930, one such critic, Karl Korsch, had begun to refer to himself as a "Western Communist". Maurice Merleau-Ponty popularized the term Western Marxism with his book Adventures of the Dialectic in 1955. Merleau-Ponty delineated a body of Marxist thought starting with György Lukács that differs from both the Soviet interpretation of Marxism and the earlier Marxism of the Second International.

History 
Perry Anderson notes that Western Marxism was born from the failure of proletarian revolutions in various advanced capitalist societies in Western EuropeGermany, Austria, Hungary and Italyin the wake of the First World War. He argues that the tradition represents a divorce between socialist theory and working-class practice that resulted from the defeat and stagnation of the Western working class after 1920.

Western Marxism traces its origins to 1923, when György Lukács's History and Class Consciousness and Karl Korsch's Marxism and Philosophy were published. In these books, Lukács and Korsch proffer a Marxism that underlines the Hegelian basis of Marx's thought. They argue that Marxism is not simply a theory of political economy that improves on its bourgeois predecessors, nor a scientific sociology, akin to the natural sciences. For them, Marxism is primarily a critiquea self-conscious transformation of society. They stipulate that Marxism does not make philosophy obsolete, as "vulgar" Marxism believes; instead Marxism preserves the truths of philosophy until their revolutionary transformation into reality.

Their work was met with hostility by the Third International, which saw Marxism as a universal science of history and nature. Nonetheless, this style of Marxism was taken up by Germany's Frankfurt School in the 1930s. The Prison Notebooks of the Italian Communist Antonio Gramsci, written during this period but not published until much later, are also classified as belonging to Western Marxism. Ernst Bloch is a contemporaneous figure who is likewise sometimes judged to be one of Western Marxism's founding fathers.

After the Second World War, a French Western Marxism was constituted by theorists based around the journals Arguments, Les Temps Modernes and Socialisme ou Barbarie such as Lucien Goldmann, Henri Lefebvre, Maurice Merleau-Ponty and Jean-Paul Sartre. This later generation of Western Marxists were overwhelmingly professional academics, and frequently professors of philosophy.

Distinctive elements

Although there have been many schools of Marxist thought that are sharply distinguished from Marxism–Leninism, such as Austromarxism or the Dutch left communism of Antonie Pannekoek and Herman Gorter, the theorists who downplay the primacy of economic analysis are considered Western Marxists. Where the base of the capitalist economy is the focus of earlier Marxists, the Western Marxists concentrate on the problems of superstructures, as their attention centres on culture, philosophy, and art.

Western Marxism often emphasises the importance of the study of culture, class consciousness and subjectivity for an adequate Marxist understanding of society. Western Marxists have thus tended to heavily use Marx's theories of commodity fetishism, ideology and alienation and have expanded on these with new concepts such as reification and cultural hegemony.

Engagement with non-Marxist systems of thought is a feature that distinguishes Western Marxism from the schools of Marxism that preceded it. Many Western Marxists have drawn from psychoanalysis to explain the effect of culture on individual consciousness. Concepts taken from German Lebensphilosophie, Weberian sociology, Piagetian psychology, French philosophy of science, phenomenology and existentialism have all been assimilated and critiqued by Western Marxists.

The epistemological principles of Marx's thought are an important theme for Western Marxism. In this regard, Western Marxists view the theoretical contributions of Friedrich Engels's Anti-Dühring as a distortion of Marx. While Engels saw dialectics as a universal and scientific law of nature, Western Marxists do not see Marxism as a general science, but solely as a theory of the cultural and historical structure of society.

Many Western Marxists believe the philosophical key to Marxism is found in the works of the Young Marx, where his encounters with Hegel, the Young Hegelians and Ludwig Feuerbach reveal what they see as the humanist core of Marxist theory. However, the structural Marxism of Louis Althusser, which attempts to purge Marxism of Hegelianism and humanism, also belongs to Western Marxism, as does the anti-Hegelianism of Galvano Della Volpe. Althusser holds that Marx's primary philosophical antecedent is not Hegel or Feuerbach but Baruch Spinoza. Della Volpe claims that Jean-Jacques Rousseau is a decisive precursor to Marx, while Della Volpe's pupil Lucio Colletti holds that the true philosophical predecessor to Marx is Immanuel Kant.

Political commitments
While Western Marxism is often contrasted with the Marxism of the Soviet Union, Western Marxists have been divided in their opinion of it and other Marxist–Leninist states. Some have offered qualified support, others have been highly critical and still others have changed their views over time: Lukács, Gramsci and Della Volpe were members of Soviet-aligned parties; Korsch, Herbert Marcuse and Guy Debord were inimical to Soviet Communism and instead advocated council communism; Sartre, Merleau-Ponty, Althusser and Lefebvre were, at different periods, supporters of the Soviet-aligned Communist Party of France, but all would later become disillusioned with it; Ernst Bloch lived in and supported the Eastern Bloc, but lost faith in Soviet Communism towards the end of his life. Nicos Poulantzas, a later Western Marxist, was an advocate for Eurocommunism.

List of Western Marxists

See also

Notes

Bibliography

Footnotes

References

Further reading

 
 
 
 
 
 
 
 
 
 
 

Eponymous political ideologies
Marxist schools of thought